Bagniewo may refer to:
Bagniewo, Kuyavian-Pomeranian Voivodeship (north-central Poland)
Bagniewo, Lubusz Voivodeship (west Poland)
Bagniewo, Pomeranian Voivodeship (north Poland)